The Our Lady of Solitude Cathedral (also Acapulco Cathedral) is the main Catholic church of the city of Acapulco, Guerrero, Mexico, located in the center of the city in front of the Álvarez Square. It has been the episcopal seat of the Archdiocese of Acapulco since 1958.

It combines architectural styles that were amalgamated during and after construction; details of Neocolonial architecture and Moorish and Byzantine style are present, the latter in the dome and the towers. The interior of the church is decorated with gold tiles and mosaics.

The space occupied by the building has been used for public worship since the founding of the parish in 1555. In 1940, the architect  was commissioned to design and reconstruct the parish, a process that was completed in the 1950s.

See also
Roman Catholicism in Mexico
Our Lady of Solitude

References

Roman Catholic cathedrals in Mexico
Roman Catholic churches completed in 1950
20th-century Roman Catholic church buildings in Mexico